Three vessels and two shore establishments of the Royal Navy have born the title of HMS Tormentor:

  was a vessel purchased in the West Indies that served as a gunboat at the capture of Martinique, St Lucia, and Guadeloupe in 1794; her fate is unknown. Her crew qualified for the Naval General Service Medal with clasp "17 Mar. Boat Service 1794"
  was an  built by Stephen; launched 22 May 1917; sold for breaking up 19 November 1929, but wrecked off South Wales while under tow en route to breakers 13 December 1929.
  was a torpedo recovery vessel; she arrived at Swansea on 1 February 2012 for breaking up.
  was a shore establishment of the British Royal Navy during World War II, based near Warsash, on the River Hamble.
 HMS Tormentor II was a WWII raining camp at Cowes, Isle of Wight

Citations

References

Royal Navy ship names